This is a list of notable schools in Maharashtra, a state in India.

Major cities and towns

Ahmednagar 
 AES Bhausaheb Firodiya Highschool

Akola 
 Mount Carmel High School
 Nishu Nursery and Kothari Convent
 Prabhat Kids School

Aurangabad 
 Nath Valley School
 Ryan International School

Kalyan 
 Birla School
 NRC School
 Old Lourdes English High School
 Sri Vani Vidyashala High School

Latur 
 Goldcrest High International School
 Kripa Sadan High School
 Podar International School, Latur
 Shri Keshavraj Vidyalaya, Latur

Malegaon 
 LVH Academy, Malegaon

Mumbai

Nagpur 
 M.B. Convent High School
 Modern School, Nagpur
 Ryan International School
 St. Francis De'Sales High School, Nagpur, Maharashtra
 St. John's High School, Nagpur

Nashik 
 Fravashi Academy
 Kilbil St Joseph's High School
 Nirmala Convent High School
 Rangubai Junnare English Medium School
 Ryan International School 
 Symbiosis School
 VIBGYOR Group of Schools, Makhmalabad

Navi Mumbai 

 Christ Academy, Kopar Khairane
 Convent of Jesus & Mary High School & Jr. College, Kharghar
 Datta Meghe College of Engineering, Airoli
 D.A.V Public School, New Panvel
 Institute of Business Studies & Research, CBD Belapur
 Mahatma School of Academics and Sports, New Panvel
 New Horizon Scholars School, Airoli
 Pillai's Institute of Information Technology Engineering, Media Studies & Research, New Panvel
 Ryan International School, Sanpada, Kharghar, Vashi, Kalamboli 
 Vibgyor High School, Airoli

Nerul 

 DAV Public School Nerul
 Ramrao Adik Institute of Technology
 Ryan International School
 St. Xavier's High School and Junior College
 SIES
 Training Ship Chanakya

Vashi 
 Agnel Polytechnic
 Avalon Heights International School
 Fr. Agnel Multipurpose School and Junior College
 Fr. Conceicao Rodrigues Institute of Technology
 Rayat Shikshan Sanstha's Modern College

Pune 
 Abhinava Vidyalaya
 Agrasen High School
 Anglo Urdu Boys' High School
 Army Public School
 AW Sindhu Vidya Bhavan
 Bhave High School
 The Bishop's School
 DAV Public School
 Delhi Public School
 Hutchings High School
 Huzurpaga
 Indus International School
 Jnana Prabodhini Prashala
 J. N. Petit Technical High School
 Kendriya Vidyalaya
 Kendriya Vidyalaya Ganeshkhind
 Loyola High School
 Mercedes-Benz International School
 Modern High School & College
 Mount Carmel Convent School
 Nagarvala Day School
 Nutan Marathi Vidyalaya
 Panditrao Agashe School
 Pawar Public School
 PMC Vidya Niketan School
 Ryan International School, Bavdhan
 St. Anne's School
 St. Mary's School
 St. Thomas' School
 St Jude High School (Pune)
 St. Vincent's High School, Jesuit
 Sanskriti School
 Shanti Sadan School, Lonavla
 Shri Shivaji Preparatory Military School
 Stella Maris English School
 Symbiosis International School
 Vibgyor High School, branches at Balewadi, Hinjewadi, Magarpatta, NIBM Road and Yerwada.
 Victorious Kidss Educares
 Wisdom World School

PimpriChinchwad, Pune 
 C. M. S. English Medium High School
 Global Indian International School
 Hindustan Antibiotics School
 Jai Hind High School and Junior College
 Jnana Prabodhini
 Vidya Niketan English Medium School
 Wisdom World School
 Elpro International School
 VIBGYOR Group of Schools

Thane 

 Bims Paradise English High School
 D. A. V. Public School
 Dnyaneshwar Dnyan Mandir High School And Junior College
 Hiranandani Foundation School
 Holy Cross Convent High School
 Little Flower High School
 Ryan International School
 Smt. Sulochanadevi Singhania School
 St. John the Baptist High School, Thane
 St Xaviers High School

Others 

 Anubhuti International Residential School, Jalgaon
 Barnes School, Deolali, Nashik district
 Carmelite Convent English High School, Vasai
 Century Rayon High School, Shahad, Thane district
 Kawthekar High School, Pandharpur
 Shri Samarth High School, Amravati
 St. Xavier's School, Kolhapur

Ahmednagar district 

 AES Bhausaheb Firodiya High School
 Dnyanmata Vidyalaya, Sangamner 
 Pravara Kanya Vidya Mandir & Jr. College
 St. Mary's School, Sangamner

Pune district 

 Cathedral Vidya School
 Sahyadri School
 UWC Mahindra College

References